The Congregation Habonim was founded in 1939 by German-Jewish immigrants who fled Nazi persecution. The founding rabbi was Hugo Hahn and his son-in-law Bernard Cohn. The current building was completed in 1958. It is located on the Upper West Side of New York City

External links

Carol Kahn Strauss Family Collection at the Leo Baeck Institute, New York, NY. This collection includes a series of documents on the Congregation Habonim, including bulletins, newspaper clippings, and copies of several anniversary journals.

References

Synagogues in Manhattan
1939 establishments in New York City
Conservative synagogues in New York City
German-Jewish culture in New York City
Synagogues completed in 1958
Upper West Side